James Cuthbertson Calderwood (19 December 1898 – June 1968) was a Scottish professional footballer who played as a full-back.

References

1898 births
1968 deaths
People from Busby, East Renfrewshire
Scottish footballers
Association football fullbacks
Manchester Calico Printers F.C. players
Manchester City F.C. players
Grimsby Town F.C. players
English Football League players
Sportspeople from East Renfrewshire